Mohammed Habib Sinaceur (1939 – 2000) was a Moroccan Politician for the Socialist Union of Popular Forces.

Biography
Sinaceur was born in eastern Morocco at Oujda. He is a member of a well connected Moroccan family. His brother Mohammed Allal Sinaceur is a writer working for UNESCO and another, Jamal Eddine Sinaceur, is a diplomat.

Sinaceur died in 2000 and in 2009 a street was named after him in Casablanca. The naming event was seen as a tribute to Sinaceur and his family. His work in human rights, support for education and being a champion for Casablanca was given as reasons for the honour.

References

2000 deaths
People from Oujda
Moroccan activists
Socialist Union of Popular Forces politicians
1939 births